Mount Airy Historic District is a national historic district located at Mount Airy, Surry County, North Carolina. The district encompasses 187 contributing buildings in the central business district and surrounding industrial and residential sections of Mount Airy.  They were primarily built between about 1880 and 1930 and include notable examples of Late Victorian and Bungalow / American Craftsman architecture. Located in the district are the separately listed W. F. Carter House and Trinity Episcopal Church.  Other notable buildings include the Abram Haywood Merritt House (1902), William A. Estes House (c. 1875), Thomas Fawcett House (c. 1895), J. D. Sargent House (1919), Campbell A. Baird House (1913), T. Benton Ashby House (c. 1912), First Baptist Church (1906-1912), Mount Airy Friends (1904), Presbyterian Church (1907-1914), Merritt Building (c. 1905-1910), Banner Building (1906), Prather Block (c. 1892), Midkiff Hardware Store (c. 1910), Welch Block (c. 1890), West Drug Store (c. 1895), Belk's Building (c. 1890), (former) Workman's Federal Savings and Loan (c. 1891), (former) First National Bank (1893), Bank of Mount Airy (1923), U.S. Post Office (1932-1933), and the Sparger Brothers Tobacco Factory.

It was added to the National Register of Historic Places in 1985, with a boundary increase in 2012, and a boundary decrease in 2021.

Gallery

References

Historic districts on the National Register of Historic Places in North Carolina
Federal architecture in North Carolina
Greek Revival architecture in North Carolina
Buildings and structures in Surry County, North Carolina
National Register of Historic Places in Surry County, North Carolina
Mount Airy, North Carolina